The Encrusted Pottery culture was an archaeological culture of the Early to Middle Bronze Age (c. 2000-1400 BC) originating in the Transdanubian region of western Hungary. It emerged from the Kisapostag culture, which was preceded by the Somogyvár-Vinkovci culture. The Encrusted Pottery culture expanded eastwards and southwards along the Danube into parts of Croatia, Serbia, Romania and Bulgaria in response to migrations from the northwest by the Tumulus culture, resulting in the emergence of groups such as Dubovác–Žuto Brdo in Serbia and Gârla Mare–Cârna in Romania, which are considered to be southern manifestations of the Encrusted Pottery culture. The culture was named after its distinctive pottery decorated with incised designs inlaid with white lime, and  southern groups are notable for the production of figurines or idols decorated in the same style. Stylistic similarities have also been noted between Encrusted Pottery artefacts and artefacts from Mycenaean Greece.

Gallery

See also 

 Ottomány culture
 Wietenberg culture
 Monteoru culture
 Tei culture
 Vatya culture
 Nordic Bronze Age
 Srubnaya culture

References 

Archaeological cultures of Central Europe
Bronze Age cultures of Europe
Archaeological cultures in Hungary
Archaeological cultures in Croatia
Archaeological cultures in Serbia
Archaeological cultures in Romania